Eleutherodactylus turquinensis is a species of frog in the family Eleutherodactylidae endemic to Cuba. Its natural habitats are subtropical or tropical moist lowland forest, subtropical or tropical moist montane forest, and rivers. It is threatened by habitat loss.

References

turquinensis
Endemic fauna of Cuba
Amphibians of Cuba
Amphibians described in 1937
Taxonomy articles created by Polbot
Taxa named by Thomas Barbour
Taxa named by Benjamin Shreve